Events from the 1340s in England

Incumbents
Monarch – Edward III

Events
 1340
 25 January – King Edward III of England is declared King of France.
 Maundy Thursday – great fire at Spondon in Derbyshire.
 24 June – Hundred Years' War: The Battle of Sluys is fought between the naval fleets of England and France. The battle ends with the almost complete destruction of the French fleet.
 26 July – Hundred Years' War: French victory at the Battle of Saint-Omer.
 25 September – Hundred Years' War: Temporary Truce of Espléchin between England and France.
 27 October – Michael of Northgate completes his translation of the Ayenbite of Inwyt.
 Weights and Measures Act provides that "Bushels and Weights shall be made and sent into every Country."
 1340 or 1341 – Richard Folville and fellow members of the Folville gang are cornered and decapitated at his church in Teigh, Rutland.
 1341
 18 January – The Queen's College in the University of Oxford, is founded.
 July – Breton War of Succession: England and France support rival claimants to the duchy of Brittany.
 1342
 20 May–22 July – Colchester is besieged and ransomed for the first time by John FitzWalter, 2nd Baron FitzWalter of Lexden in a dispute with the townspeople.
 18 August – Breton War of Succession: The English win a decisive naval battle over the Genoese fleet at the Battle of Brest.
 September – Breton War of Succession: Indecisive Battle of Morlaix fought between the French and the English.
 October – Breton War of Succession: England conquers most of Brittany.
 1343
 28 March – earthquake felt in Lindsey, Lincolnshire.
 May – English forces under Henry, 3rd Earl of Lancaster, accompanied by his son Henry, Earl of Derby, and  William Montagu, Earl of Salisbury, arrive to aid the Crown of Castile in the Siege of Algeciras (1342–44).
 1344
 19 June – three-day "Round Table" tournament held at Windsor Castle.
 Edward III introduces three new gold coins, the florin, leopard, and helm. Unfortunately the amount of gold in the coins does not match their value of six shillings, three shillings, and one shilling and sixpence, so they have to be withdrawn and mostly melted down by August of this year.
 Hundred Years' War: Peace talks, sponsored by the Avignon Pope, fail.
 Licence to crenellate Chillingham Castle in Northumberland issued.
 1345
 August – Hundred Years' War: English victory over the French at the Battle of Bergerac.
 21 October – Hundred Years' War: English victory over the French at the Battle of Auberoche.
 1346
 April – Hundred Years' War: French invade Gascony.
 9 June – Breton War of Succession: At the Battle of St Pol de Leon, Thomas Dagworth's army defeats that of Charles, Duke of Brittany.
 26 July – Hundred Years' War: English victory over the French at the Battle of Caen.
 24 August – Hundred Years' War: English victory over the French at the Battle of Blanchetaque.
 26 August – Hundred Years' War: The English under Edward III and Edward, the Black Prince win a decisive victory over the French at the Battle of Crécy.
 4 September – Hundred Years' War: English besiege Calais.
 17 October – Second War of Scottish Independence: England wins a decisive victory over the Scots at the Battle of Neville's Cross.
 1347
 June – Hundred Years' War: English defeat a French claimant to the duchy of Brittany.
 4 August – Hundred Years' War: English capture Calais following the Siege of Calais. The town remains an English possession until 1558.
 28 September – Hundred Years' War: Temporary truce with France.
 24 December – Pembroke College in the University of Cambridge is founded by Marie de St Pol, Countess of Pembroke, as the Hall of Valence Marie.
 1348
 January – Gonville Hall, the forerunner of Gonville and Caius College, Cambridge, is founded.
 23 April (Saint George's Day) – Edward III creates the first English order of chivalry, the Order of the Garter, at Windsor Castle.
 By 24 June – the Black Death pandemic has reached England, having probably been brought by a sailor from Gascony to the port of Melcombe (modern-day Weymouth, Dorset). It spreads across the south and west, rapidly reaching (or perhaps arising separately at) Bristol.
 1 July – Joan, daughter of Edward III, dies of the Black Death at Bordeaux while en route to marry Peter of Castile.
 28 September – John de Ufford nominated to the Archbishopric of Canterbury by papal bull.
 By November – the Black Death has reached London.
 14 December – John de Ufford becomes Archbishop of Canterbury.
 1349
 Black Death in England reaches the north, devastating York (May) and Chester. Over 20% of the population die.
 27 March – An earthquake strikes Meaux Abbey.
 20 May – John de Ufford dies of the Black Death before being consecrated Archbishop of Canterbury.
 18 June – The Ordinance of Labourers issued due to the large number of agricultural workers killed by the Black Death.
 19 June – Thomas Bradwardine elected to the Archbishopric of Canterbury.
 25 August – Thomas Bradwardine dies of the Plague.
 October – Hundred Years' War: Small royal force enters Calais to protect the town against capture by France.
 17 November – Pope Clement VI annuls the marriage of William Montacute, 2nd Earl of Salisbury, and Joan of Kent, on the grounds of her prior marriage to Thomas Holland, 1st Earl of Kent.
 20 December – Simon Islip enthroned as Archbishop of Canterbury.

Births
1340
 6 March – John of Gaunt, 1st Duke of Lancaster (died 1399)
1341
 5 June – Edmund of Langley, son of King Edward III of England (died 1402)
 10 November – Henry Percy, 1st Earl of Northumberland (died 1408)
1342
 Humphrey de Bohun, 7th Earl of Hereford (died 1373)
 Julian of Norwich, mystic (died 1413)
1343
 Thomas Percy, 1st Earl of Worcester, rebel (died 1403)
 Approximate date – Geoffrey Chaucer, poet (died 1400)
1344
Edmund Stafford, Lord Chancellor of England and Bishop of Exeter (died 1419)
1345
 25 March – Blanche of Lancaster, wife of John of Gaunt (died 1369)
 Eleanor Maltravers, noblewoman (died 1405)
1346
Richard FitzAlan, 11th Earl of Arundel (died 1397)
1348
 John FitzAlan, 1st Baron Arundel (died 1379)
 Approximate date – Alice Perrers, mistress of King Edward III (died 1400/01)

Deaths
1340
 4 December – Henry Burghersh, bishop and chancellor (born 1292)
 William Melton, archbishop (year of birth unknown)
1341
 Richard Folville, outlaw and parson, dies resisting arrest (year of birth unknown)
1344
William Montacute, 1st Earl of Salisbury (born 1301)
1345
 14 April – Richard Aungerville, writer and bishop (born 1287)
 22 September – Henry, 3rd Earl of Lancaster (born 1281)
Richard De Bury, scholar (born 1281)
1346
Eustace Folville, outlaw (year of birth unknown)
1347
 Adam Murimuth, ecclesiastic and chronicler (born 1274)
 John de Warenne, 7th Earl of Surrey (born 1286)
1348
 John de Stratford, Archbishop of Canterbury (year of birth unknown)
1349
 10 April – William of Ockham, philosopher (born 1285)
 31 May – Thomas Wake, politician (born 1297)
 26 August – Thomas Bradwardine, Archbishop of Canterbury
 29 September – Richard Rolle, religious writer (born 1300)

References